Square Tilt is an outdoor 1983 steel sculpture by American artist Joel Perlman, installed on the University of Texas at Austin campus in Austin, Texas, United States. The work is owned by the Metropolitan Museum of Art. The Metropolitan Museum of Art also has a maquette for Square Tilt in its collection.

See also
 1983 in art

References

External links
 

1983 sculptures
Sculptures of the Metropolitan Museum of Art
Outdoor sculptures in Austin, Texas
Steel sculptures in Texas